Dieudonné Devrindt (24 December 1911 – 31 January 1994) was a Belgian sprinter. He competed in the men's 100 metres at the 1936 Summer Olympics.

References

1911 births
1994 deaths
Athletes (track and field) at the 1936 Summer Olympics
Belgian male sprinters
Olympic athletes of Belgium
Place of birth missing